Joachim Müller (born 15 July 1952) is a German former professional footballer who played as a midfielder.

References

1952 births
Living people
German footballers
Chemnitzer FC players
DDR-Oberliga players
Association football midfielders
East Germany international footballers
German football managers
Chemnitzer FC managers
FC Wil managers
German expatriate football managers
Expatriate football managers in Switzerland
German expatriate sportspeople in Switzerland
People from Zwickau
Footballers from Saxony